Sarıca may refer to:

Places 
Azerbaijan
 Sarıca, Azerbaijan

Turkey
 Sarıca, İvrindi, Balıkesir Province
 Sarıca, Biga, Çanakkale Province
 Sarıca, Çermik, Diyarbakır Province
 Sarıca, Eğil, Diyarbakır Province
 Sarıca, Kastamonu, Kastamonu Province

People 
 Ayşegül Sarıca (born 1935), Turkish pianist
 Didem Sarıca (born 1977), Turkish basketball player
 Ufuk Sarıca (born 1972), Turkish basketball coach